The townsend (symbol Td) is a physical unit of the reduced electric field (ratio E/N), where  is electric field and  is concentration of neutral particles.

It is named after John Sealy Townsend, who conducted early research into gas ionisation.

Definition
It is defined by the relation

For example, an electric field of

in a medium with the density of an ideal gas at 1 atm, the Loschmidt constant

gives

,

Uses

The concentration , which is in ideal gas simply related to pressure and temperature, controls the mean free path and collision frequency. The electric field  governs the energy gained between two successive collisions.

Reduced electric field being a scaling factor effectively means, that increasing the electric field intensity E by some factor q has the same consequences as lowering gas density N by factor q.

See also

Electric glow discharge
Vacuum arc

References

 A Bankovic´, S Dujko, R D White, J P Marler, S J Buckman, S Marjanovic´, G Malovic´, G Garc´ıa and Z Lj Petrovic, Positron transport in water vapour.  2012 New J. Phys. 14 035003.

Electrical breakdown
Plasma physics